Quad Studios Nashville was a four-studio recording facility established as Quadrafonic Sound Studio in 1971 on Music Row in Nashville, Tennessee, US. The studio was the location of numerous notable recording sessions, including Neil Young's Harvest, Jimmy Buffett's "Margaritaville", Joan Baez' "The Night They Drove Old Dixie Down", and Dobie Gray's "Drift Away". The studio's location has been the home of Sienna Recording Studios since 2014.

History

Quadrafonic Sound Studio
Established by session musicians David Briggs and Norbert Putnam as Quadrafonic Sound Studio in 1971, the studio immediately became the home of many major recording sessions including Neil Young's Harvest album which included the single "Heart of Gold". Kris Kristofferson brought Joan Baez to the studio in 1971 to record her album Blessed Are..., including her hit recording of "The Night They Drove Old Dixie Down", and Dan Fogelberg recorded his debut studio album ''Home Free the following year. Other artists recording at Quadrafonic in its early years included Grand Funk Railroad, The Jackson Five, The Pointer Sisters, Joe Walsh and The James Gang, Pousette-Dart Band, and Dobie Gray, who recorded his R&B classic "Drift Away" at Quad Studios in 1972. In 1976, Jimmy Buffett recorded his biggest hit, "Margaritaville" from his best selling album Changes In Latitudes, Changes In Attitudes at the studio, and Buffet later donated a stained-glass window for the studio's upstairs bathroom. 

The studios originally featured a Quad Eight mixing console and 16-track Ampex MM1100 two-inch tape recorder. In 1975, the owners replaced the Quad Eight with an MCI 500-series mixing console.

Quad Recording Studios
In 1980, Putnam and Briggs sold Quadrafonic for $1 million to Gerald G. Patterson and Lou Gonzalez, owner of the similarly-named Quad Studios in New York City. The new owners remodeled and expanded the studios. "Studio A" featured an 80-input SSL 9000J console, the "Neve Room", which was Quadrafonic's original studio, had a vintage Neve 8068 mixing console with Flying Faders automation. Two additional smaller studio suites each featured Pro Tools HD systems. Artists recording at Quad Studios Nashville included Keith Urban, Taylor Swift, Lady A, The Fray, Jewel, Phil Vassar, George Strait, Toby Keith, T-Bone Burnett, and The Dead Daisies.

Sienna Recording Studios
In 2014, Quad Studios was purchased by hit songwriter Marti Frederiksen and Round Hill Music CEO Josh Gruss. The studios were renovated and restored, and renamed Sienna Recording Studios, with Round Hill establishing new business offices upstairs.

References

External links 
 Sienna Studios Nashville - Our History

Recording studios in Tennessee